Robert Earl "Kool" Bell (born October 8, 1950), also known by his Muslim name Muhammad Bayyan, is an American musician, singer & songwriter. 

He is one of the founding members of the American R&B, soul, funk and disco band Kool & the Gang.

Early life and career
Bell was born in Youngstown, Ohio, and grew up in Jersey City, New Jersey. 

Along with his brother, Ronald Bell, he began playing jazz & in 1964 they formed a group named The Jazziacs.  

They began playing at clubs in New York City under a series of different band names before settling on the name "Kool & The Gang" in 1968.

See also
List of people from Youngstown, Ohio
List of people from Jersey City, New Jersey

References

External links
Kool and the Gang website

1950 births
Living people
African-American Muslims
African-American male singer-songwriters
American funk bass guitarists
American male guitarists
American disco singers
American funk singers
American jazz bass guitarists
American jazz singers
American soul singers
Kool & the Gang members
Musicians from Jersey City, New Jersey
Musicians from Youngstown, Ohio
American male bass guitarists
20th-century American bass guitarists
21st-century American bass guitarists
Guitarists from Ohio
Guitarists from New Jersey
American male jazz musicians
African-American guitarists
20th-century African-American male singers
Singer-songwriters from New York (state)
Singer-songwriters from Ohio
Singer-songwriters from New Jersey